Tolcarne Wartha is a hamlet in west Cornwall, England, United Kingdom. It is between Porkellis and Four Lanes near the hill of Carnmenellis.

References

Hamlets in Cornwall